Yuria Ito (born 2 April 2001) is a Japanese professional footballer who plays as a goalkeeper for WE League club AC Nagano Parceiro Ladies.

Club career 
Ito made her WE League debut on 12 September 2021.

References 

Living people
2001 births
Women's association football goalkeepers
WE League players
Japanese women's footballers
AC Nagano Parceiro Ladies players
Association football people from Nagano Prefecture